Campylodiscus is a genus of diatoms in the family Surirellaceae.

References

External links
 
 
 Campylodiscus at algaebase

Diatom genera
Surirellales